is a passenger railway station in the city of Hashimoto, Wakayama Prefecture, Japan, operated by the private railway company Nankai Electric Railway.

Lines
Kii-Shimizu Station is served by the Nankai Kōya Line, and is located 47.8 kilometers from the terminus of the line at Shiomibashi Station and 47.1 kilometers from Namba Station.

Station layout
The station consists of two opposed side platforms connected to the station building by a level crossing. The station is unattended.

Platforms

Adjacent stations

History
Kii-Shimizu Station opened on March 15, 1925. The Nankai Railway was merged into the Kintetsu group in 1944 by orders of the Japanese government, and reemerged as the Nankai Railway Company in 1947.

Passenger statistics
In fiscal 2019, the station was used by an average of 251 passengers daily (boarding passengers only).

Surrounding area
 Hashimoto City Shimizu Elementary School
 Jofukuji Temple,

See also
List of railway stations in Japan

References

External links

 Kii-Shimizu Station Official Site

Railway stations in Japan opened in 1925
Railway stations in Wakayama Prefecture
Hashimoto, Wakayama